Erasmo Ramirez may refer to:
	
 Erasmo Ramirez (left-handed pitcher)  (born 1976), American Major League Baseball left-handed relief pitcher from 2003-2007
 Erasmo Ramírez (right-handed pitcher) (born 1990), Nicaraguan Major League Baseball right-handed pitcher